Thomas Reid D.D. (1710–1796), was Professor of Moral Philosophy at the University of Glasgow and founder of the Scottish common sense movement in philosophy. Remarkably, his tombstone is to be found in the vestibule of the main building of Glasgow University and directly under the 85m (278 feet) high tower of the Gilbert Scott Building. Reid’s remains were originally laid in Blackfriars Church burial-ground, on the grounds of Glasgow College in the High Street, Glasgow. The tombstone was removed when the College moved to Gilmorehill in 1870. It was placed in its present position when the building of the Tower above it was begun, thus forming a fitting ‘monument’ to Reid. In comparison, the Scott Monument in Edinburgh is only .

Inscriptions
Tombstone inscription may be translated as follows:

The full Latin inscription is as follows:

Relocation
When the Glasgow College buildings in the High Street were demolished, Reid’s remains were placed with those of other professors and their families in the Professors’ Monument in the Glasgow Necropolis near Glasgow Cathedral. The Monument is at the south end of the sixth row of monuments from the eastern end of the cemetery, and overlooking Reid’s home in Drygate. It has the following inscription: "In memory of Professors of the University of Glasgow and members of their family whose bodies were interred in Blackfriars Churchyard and removed here in 1876."

References

Monuments and memorials in Glasgow